Sri Sri is a 2016 Indian Telugu-language drama film written and directed by Muppalaneni Shiva. The film stars Krishna, Vijaya Nirmala, Angana Roy, Kunal Kaushik, Naresh, Murali Sharma and Sai Kumar. It was final film of Krishna before his death in 2022.

Plot
The film revolves round a retired law professor Sripada Srinivasa Rao (Krishna) and his family. Their happiness, the only daughter is killed by powerful and merciless people and how Sri Sri takes revenge on the killers of his daughter forms the crux of the story

Cast

Krishna as Sripada Srinivasa Rao/Sri Sri
Vijaya Nirmala as Sumathi 
Angana Roy as Shweta 
Kunal Kaushik as Aadi
Murali Sharma as J. K. Bharadwaj
Naresh
Posani Krishna Murali
Sai Kumar
Ravi Prakash
Madhu Thotapalli
L. B. Sriram
Ashish Gandhi as Rahul
 Mahesh Babu (voiceover)
Sudheer Babu (cameo appearance)

Soundtrack

Reception

Sri Sri was released with mixed reviews. Indiaglitz rated the film with 2.5/5 stars stating that the film wasted an opportunity to present Krishna in an interesting revenge tale, but his fans will enjoy the veteran's performance. while AP Herald mentioned the film as an average fare as its first half is really exciting with many revenge scenes while the second half turned out to be a complete disappointment. They appreciated the performance of Krishna mentioning as "Super Star Krishna fits in shoes of Law college professor perfectly and his dialogue delivery is still powerful and the team has used him to perfection". 123telugu wrote that the film is passable as revenge drama and Krishna excelled in a tailor-made role for him.

References

2016 films
2010s Telugu-language films
Indian action drama films
Films directed by Muppalaneni Shiva
2016 action drama films